Wilford F. (Min) Leibrook (January 18, 1903 - June 8, 1943) was an American jazz tubist and bassist.

Born in Hamilton, Ohio, Leibrook began as a cornetist before switching to tuba and bass. In the 1920s he played in the Ten Foot Band in Chicago. He played in The Wolverines in 1924 alongside Bix Beiderbecke, where he made his first recordings, and later joined the band of Arnold Johnson.

In 1927 he moved to New York City, where he played in the Paul Whiteman Orchestra until 1931. During this time he began recording on bass saxophone, mostly with small jazz groups from the Whiteman band under Beiderbecke and Frankie Trumbauer.

He worked later in the 1930s with Lennie Hayton and Eddie Duchin, mostly on string bass. In 1936 he played in the group The Three T's, with Trumbauer, Jack Teagarden, and Charlie Teagarden.

By the late 1930s, Leibrook moved to Los Angeles and worked as a bassist in Manny Strand’s Band at the Earl Carroll Theater. He never recorded as a leader.

Leibrook died at age 40 as a result of meningitis. He is buried in Forest Lawn Memorial Park, Glendale.

References

Scott Yanow, [ Min Leibrook] at Allmusic

1903 births
1943 deaths
American jazz tubists
American male jazz musicians
American jazz double-bassists
Male double-bassists
20th-century American musicians
20th-century double-bassists
20th-century American male musicians
The Wolverines (jazz band) members